The DFS 230 was a German transport glider operated by the Luftwaffe in World War II. It was developed in 1933 by the Deutsche Forschungsanstalt für Segelflug (DFS - "German Research Institute for Sailplane Flight") with Hans Jacobs as the head designer. The glider was the German inspiration for the British Hotspur glider and was intended for airborne assault operations.

In addition to the pilot, the DFS-230 glider had room for nine men who sat close together on a narrow bench located in the middle of the fuselage (six facing forward, and four backward). Entry and exit to the cramped interior was by a single side door. The front passenger could operate its only armament, a machine gun. It was an assault glider, designed to land directly on top of its target, so it was equipped with a parachute brake. This allowed the glider to approach its target in a dive at an angle of eighty degrees and land within  of its target.

It played significant roles in the operations at Fort Eben-Emael, the Battle of Crete, and in the rescue of Benito Mussolini. It was also used in North Africa. However, it was used chiefly in supplying encircled forces on the Eastern Front such as supplying the Demyansk Pocket, the Kholm Pocket, Stalingrad, and the defenders of Festung Budapest (until February 12, 1945). Although production ceased in 1943, it was used right up to the end of the war, for instance, supplying Berlin and Breslau until May 1945.

By means of a cable running along the tow rope the pilots of the tow-plane and of the freight glider were able to communicate with each other which made blind flying possible, when necessary. It dropped its landing gear as soon as it was safely in the air, and landed by means of a landing skid. The DFS-230 could be towed by a Ju 52 (which could tow two with difficulty), a He 111, a Ju 87, Hs 126, a Bf 110, or a Bf 109. The Ju 52 towed the glider using a  cable or, in bad weather, a much shorter rigid bar connected by an articulated joint to the tow aircraft. The DFS-230 had the highest glide ratio (8:1) of any World War 2 military glider other than the Antonov A-7. This was because it was thought that the glider had to be capable of a long approach during landing, so that it could be released a greater distance from the target so the sound of the towing aircraft did not alert the enemy.

Variants

DFS 230 A-1
Initial production version

DFS 230 A-2
A-1 with dual-controls

DFS 230 B-1
Braking parachute added, able to carry defensive armament (MG 34 machine gun)

DFS 230 B-2
B-1 with dual-controls

DFS 230 C-1
Late production version; B-1 with nose braking rockets

DFS 230 D-1
C-1 with improved nose braking rocket design, one prototype (DFS 230 V6)

DFS 230 F-1
Larger version with capacity for 15 soldiers, one prototype (DFS 230 V7, DV+AV)

Wind tunnel testing revealed little or no advantage over the standard DFS 230 so further work was abandoned.

Focke-Achgelis Fa 225A single DFS 230 converted to an auto-gyro by replacing the wings with the 3-bladed rotor from a Focke-Achgelis Fa 223, mounted on a pylon above the fuselage. The undercarriage was revised to include long oleo shock absorbers with a wide track for stability. Towed behind a Junkers Ju 52/3m during trials, it was found that the low towing speed and low approach speed made the combination more vulnerable to attack.

Specifications (DFS 230 B-1)

See also
 Hanna Reitsch

Notes

Further reading

External links

 

1930s German military transport aircraft
Glider aircraft
World War II transport aircraft of Germany
DFS 230
Aircraft first flown in 1937